Rosemary Bamforth (19 October 1924 – 17 April 2018) was a Scottish pathologist who worked at Bletchley Park during the Second World War. She was born to Isobel Ince and Douglas Ince, a director of a Glasgow firm. Working as a consultant at Southampton Hospital, she made an early link in her research between ship workers dying of mesothelioma and asbestos exposure on ships, before the cause of this illness had been fully determined. She took part in the Round-the-Island race at Hayling Island in her sixties.

Personal life 
Dr. Rosemary Margaret Warren Bamforth, was born Rosemary Ince on 19 October 1924 in Glasgow from mother Isobel Ince and father Douglas Ince, director of an engineering company. She was one of two children with her brother David Ince, air force pilot during WWII. Bamforth met her husband John Bamforth, while they both worked as doctors at Southampton General Hospital and they got married in 1960. Together, they had two daughters and a son. Rosemary Bamforth died on the 17 April 2018 at the age of 93.

Education 
Rosemary Bamforth attended school in Glasgow at Laurel Bank, followed by Beacon School in Bridge of Allan then attended the Cheltenham Ladies College. Bamforth planned on studying medicine at the University of Glasgow and applied at the age of sixteen. She was politely rejected and asked to apply again once she was seventeen. In 1941, she joined instead the Women's Royal Naval Service. Bamforth returned to studying medicine after the Second World War and matriculated in 1946 at the University of Glasgow, where she graduated with a Bachelor of Medecine in 1951 thanks to a Further Education and Training Grant.

Military service 

Rosemary Bamforth completed her initial WRNS at Balloch by Loch Lomond and was then posted to Outstation Eastcote in Hillingdon, one of the outstations of Bletchley Park, where she was taught teleprinting. She moved from there to the Bletchley outstation at Stanmore, before eventually joining the team of Hut 11 in Bletchley Park itself, working on the Turing-Welchman Bombe machines. Bamforth had to keep these details of her military service secret until the mid-1970s when the history of Bletchley Park was declassified.

Career 
After graduating, Rosemary Bamforth built her medical experience at both hospitals in the United States (McGill University and Meadowbrook Hospital in Hempstead) and the UK, where she practised at hospitals in London, Southampton and Portsmouth. Bamforth specialised as a pathologist and during her time in the United States, she became a recognised specialist in the analysis and diagnosis of cancer from the study of tissue samples.

Whilst working at Southampton Hospital, working at the hospital as a senior registrar, Rosemary Bamforth made the link between a number of ship workers dying of mesothelioma and asbestos exposure on ships. She delivered a paper on her findings to Southampton doctors. Her conclusions raised controversy in the profession at the time, but were later backed up by subsequent research into Asbestosis.

References 

1924 births
2018 deaths
Scottish pathologists
Bletchley Park women
Scottish women scientists
Scientists from Glasgow
20th-century Scottish scientists
Alumni of the University of Glasgow
People educated at Cheltenham Ladies' College
Bletchley Park people
Women's Royal Naval Service personnel of World War II